Beverly William Wallace (March 7, 1923 – June 17, 1992) was an American football player who played at the quarterback position on both offense and defense. He played college football for Compton City College and professional football for the San Francisco 49ers and New York Yanks.

Early years
Wallace was born in 1923 in Comanche, Oklahoma. He attended Santa Paul High School and Compton High School, both in California.

College football 
Wallace played college football for Compton College in 1941, 1942, and 1946. He also served in the United States Army. He played halfback at Compton, passed for 1,172 yards in 1946, and led the team to a national junior college football championship and a 19–0 victory over Kilgore Junior College in the first annual "Little Rose Bowl"

Professional football
Wallace played professional football in the All-America Football Conference for the San Francisco 49ers during their 1947, 1948, and 1949 seasons. He appeared in a total of 23 games for the 49ers. He also appeared in one game for the 1951 New York Yanks. He totaled 266 passing yards in his four years in professional football.

Family and later years
Wallace died in 1992 at age 69 in Newport Beach, California.

References

1923 births
1992 deaths
San Francisco 49ers (AAFC) players
New York Yanks players
Players of American football from Oklahoma
People from Comanche, Oklahoma
American football quarterbacks
United States Army personnel of World War II
San Francisco 49ers players